Mason Lane Thompson (born February 20, 1998) is an American professional baseball pitcher for the Washington Nationals of Major League Baseball (MLB). He previously played in MLB for the San Diego Padres.

Amateur career
Thompson attended Round Rock High School in Round Rock, Texas. He underwent Tommy John surgery as a junior, and pitched only one inning as a senior. He was selected by the San Diego Padres in the third round, 85th overall, of the 2016 Major League Baseball draft. He signed for $1.75 million, forgoing his commitment to play college baseball for the Texas Longhorns.

Professional career

San Diego Padres
Thompson made his professional debut with the Arizona League Padres, tossing 12 innings of 2.25 ERA ball. In 2017, Thompson played for the Single-A Fort Wayne TinCaps, posting a 2-4 record and 4.67 ERA in seven appearances. He returned to Fort Wayne for the 2018 season, pitching to a 6-8 record and 4.94 ERA with 97 strikeouts in 93 innings of work. In 2019, Thompson played for the High-A Lake Elsinore Storm, only appearing in seven games due to injury, and recorded an 0-5 record and 7.66 ERA. Thompson did not play in a game in 2020 due to the cancellation of the minor league season because of the COVID-19 pandemic. The Padres added him to their 40-man roster after the 2020 season. 

On June 20, 2021, Thompson was promoted to the major leagues for the first time. He made his MLB debut on June 22, pitching one-third of an inning against the Los Angeles Dodgers, and earning a hold.

Washington Nationals
On July 30, 2021, Thompson and Jordy Barley were traded to the Washington Nationals in exchange for Daniel Hudson. He was activated the next day and made his Nationals debut on August 2.

On April 10, 2022, Thompson was placed on the injured list due to a biceps injury. He was transferred to the 60-day IL on May 10 with biceps tendinitis.

On September 5, 2022, he earned his first major league save by pitching the final three scoreless innings against the St. Louis Cardinals in a 6-0 Nationals win in St. Louis.

References

External links

1998 births
Living people
People from Round Rock, Texas
Baseball players from Texas
Major League Baseball pitchers
San Diego Padres players
Washington Nationals players
Arizona League Padres players
Fort Wayne TinCaps players
Lake Elsinore Storm players
El Paso Chihuahuas players
Rochester Red Wings players
Florida Complex League Nationals players